Stuckenia filiformis is a species of flowering plant belonging to the family Potamogetonaceae.

Its native range is Temperate Northern Hemisphere, Hispaniola, Ecuador to South America.

Synonym:
 Potamogeton filiformis Pers.

References

Potamogetonaceae